Craig Roberts (born 1991) is a Welsh actor and director

Craig Roberts may also refer to:

Craig Roberts (wrestler) (1968–2006), Canadian wrestler
Craig G. Roberts (1930–2009), American horse trainer

See also
Craig Roberts Stapleton (born 1945), American diplomat and businessman